Boyd Reith (born 5 May 1999) is a Dutch professional footballer who plays for Eerste Divisie club Roda JC Kerkrade as a right-back.

Early career
Reith came through the youth academy at SC Feyenoord and played for the same Dutch U17 team as more famous names such as Matthijs de Ligt, Justin Kluivert and Donyell Malen. He joined Sparta Rotterdam  in 2020 without making a professional appearance for Feyenoord.

Career
Reith made senior appearances for Sparta Rotterdam in the Tweede Divisie. Overall however, the move to Sparta did not work out for Reith, he attributed this to the fact that he was a younger player in the squad and he did not get as many playing minutes as he wanted because the team management preferred to pick experienced players to try and avoid the club suffering relegation. He moved to Helmond Sport in August 2020. 

Reith made his debut in the Eerste Divisie on 29 August 2020 in a 2-1 away win over TOP Oss. After 2 seasons at Helmond Sport Reith was offered a new contract but felt it was the right time to move on. On his final appearance for Helmond he scored a 95th minute equaliser in a 1-1 draw with FC Den Bosch in May, 2022. 

He was announced as a new signing for Roda JC Kerkrade, signing a two year contract with the option of a further year, on 27 May 2022.

References

External links

 

1999 births
Living people
Dutch footballers
Eerste Divisie players
Association football fullbacks
People from Rotterdam
Sportspeople from Rotterdam
Footballers from Rotterdam
SC Feyenoord players
Helmond Sport players
Roda JC Kerkrade players
Sparta Rotterdam players